The Men's Super Smash, currently named the Dream11 Super Smash for sponsorship purposes until 2026, is a men's domestic Twenty20 cricket competition in New Zealand. Since the 2018–19 season, the competition runs alongside the Women's Super Smash.

History
The tournament consists of a double round-robin, with the top three teams qualifying for the play-offs.

The competition has been held every year since 2005 and its former names include:
New Zealand Twenty20 Competition 2005–06
State Twenty20 from 2006–07 to 2008–09
HRV Cup from 2009–10 to 2012–13
HRV Twenty20 2013–14

Since the 2014–15 season, the competition has been known as the Super Smash with many different sponsors exercising their own naming rights:
Georgie Pie from 2014–15 to 2015–16
McDonald's 2016–17
Burger King from 2017–18 to 2018–19
Dream11 from 2019–20 to present (sponsorship contract expires in 2026)

From 2008–09 to 2013–14 the winner of the competition gained entry to the Champions League Twenty20 tournament later in the same year.

Teams

6 teams play in the Super Smash.
4 teams are based on the North Island.
2 teams are based on the South Island.
Following teams play in this tournament:

Tournament results
Results of each season are here:

Notes
From the 2008–09 season until the 2013–14 season, the winning team would qualify for the Champions League Twenty20.
From the 2010–11 season onwards, each team is allowed up to two international imports.

See also

 Women's Super Smash
 Plunket Shield
 Hallyburton Johnstone Shield
 The Ford Trophy
 Cricket in New Zealand

References

External links
 

 
New Zealand domestic cricket competitions
Recurring sporting events established in 2005
Twenty20 cricket leagues
Professional cricket leagues
Professional sports leagues in New Zealand